Cosquin Rock is an Argentine music festival, held annually since 2001. It is held at Cosquín, Córdoba. Important national rock singers and groups participate in the festival, along with some of the most important international rock bands, mostly of Spanish-speaking countries like Spain, Mexico and Uruguay. It is held in February during the summer holidays, and is one of the most popular music festivals in the country with more than 150,000 people attending each year.

Some of the acts performing in the 2007 edition included Andrew Tosh, Gondwana, Ratos de Porao, Hereford, Babasónicos, Attaque 77, Las Pelotas, Rata Blanca, Kapanga, Intoxicados, Las Pastillas del Abuelo, Callejeros, Carajo, Almafuerte, La 25, Los Pericos and others. The bands will be performing in a main stage, and two secondary stages.
In 2009 the festival was headlined by British hard rock band Deep Purple. Since 2011, the setting changed to the aerodrome in Santa Maria de Punilla, because the producer, José Palazzo, had problems with residents of the commune.

External links
Official site 

Rock festivals in Argentina
Music festivals in Argentina
Tourist attractions in Córdoba Province, Argentina
2001 establishments in Argentina
Music festivals established in 2001
Summer events in Argentina